Olivier Polge is a French perfumer. He is the house perfumer for Chanel and has created fragrances including Misia, Boy, and Chanel's No. 5 L’eau.

Polge's father is perfumer Jacques Polge, who served as Chanel's perfumer for 37 years. When Polge was a child, he wanted to be a classical music pianist, but was not a "good pianist." Polge became an intern at Chanel while studying art history. He worked for International Flavours and Fragrances, where he co-created Dior Homme and Viktor and Rolf's Flowerbomb. In 2013, Polge became a perfumer at Chanel. His father retired in 2015, and Polge took over as head perfumer.

With the beginning of 2022 Zoe Magazine present the new fragrance for men BLEU DE CHANEL, created by Olivier Polge in collaboration with Laboratoire Parfums CHANEL. The face of this project involves Marco Castelli not only as a model but also as a designer as represented in his precious bicolor tailored garments.

References

Chanel people
French perfumers
Living people
1974 births